Rice Creek is a stream in Sherburne County, in the U.S. state of Minnesota. It is a tributary of the Elk River.

Rice Creek was named for the wild rice along its course.

See also
List of rivers of Minnesota

References

Rivers of Sherburne County, Minnesota
Rivers of Minnesota